Arcuphantes is a genus of dwarf spiders that was first described by Ralph Vary Chamberlin & Vaine Wilton Ivie in 1943.

Species
 it contains fifty-seven species found in Asia (many in Japan and Korea) and North America:
A. arcuatulus (Roewer, 1942) – USA, Canada
A. ashifuensis (Oi, 1960) – Japan
A. awanus Ono & Saito, 2001 – Japan
A. cavaticus Chamberlin & Ivie, 1943 – USA
A. chikunii Oi, 1979 – Japan
A. chilboensis Oi, 1979 – Korea
A. chinensis Tanasevitch, 2006 – China
A. concheus Ono & Saito, 2001 – Japan
A. cruciatus Jin, Ma & Tu, 2018 – USA
A. curvomarginatus Ma, Marusik & Tu, 2016 – USA
A. decoratus Chamberlin & Ivie, 1943 – USA
A. delicatus (Chikuni, 1955) – Japan
A. dentatus Ma, Marusik & Tu, 2016 – USA
A. denticulatus Jin, Ma & Tu, 2018 – USA
A. digitatus Saito, 1992 – Japan
A. dubiosus Heimer, 1987 – Mongolia
A. elephantis Ono & Saito, 2001 – Japan
A. ephippiatus Paik, 1985 – Korea
A. fragilis Chamberlin & Ivie, 1943 (type) – USA
A. fujiensis Yaginuma, 1972 – Japan
A. hamadai Oi, 1979 – Japan
A. hastatus Ono & Saito, 2001 – Japan
A. hikosanensis Saito, 1992 – Japan
A. hokkaidanus Saito, 1992 – Japan
A. iriei Saito, 1992 – Japan
A. juwangensis Seo, 2006 – Korea
A. keumsanensis Paik & Seo, 1984 – Korea
A. kobayashii Oi, 1979 – Korea, Japan
A. longipollex Seo, 2013 – Korea
A. longissimus Saito, 1992 – Japan
A. namhaensis Seo, 2006 – Korea
A. namweonensis Seo, 2006 – Korea
A. orbiculatus Saito, 1992 – Japan
A. osugiensis (Oi, 1960) – Japan
A. paiki Saito, 1992 – Japan
A. pennatoides Paik, 1983 – Korea
A. pennatus Paik, 1983 – Korea
A. pictilis Chamberlin & Ivie, 1943 – USA
A. potteri Chamberlin & Ivie, 1943 – USA
A. profundus Seo, 2013 – Korea
A. pulchellus Paik, 1978 – Korea
A. pyeongchangensis Paik, 1978 – Korea
A. rarus Seo, 2013 – Korea
A. rostratus Ono & Saito, 2001 – Japan
A. saragaminensis Ono & Saito, 2001 – Japan
A. scitulus Paik, 1974 – Korea
A. semiorbiculatus Jin, Ma & Tu, 2018 – USA
A. sylvaticus Chamberlin & Ivie, 1943 – USA
A. tamaensis (Oi, 1960) – Japan
A. trifidus Seo, 2013 – Korea
A. troglodytarum (Oi, 1960) – Japan
A. tsushimanus Ono & Saito, 2001 – Japan
A. uenoi Saito, 1992 – Japan
A. uhmi Seo & Sohn, 1997 – Korea
A. yamakawai (Oi, 1960) – Japan

See also
 List of Linyphiidae species

References

Araneomorphae genera
Linyphiidae
Spiders of Asia
Spiders of North America